This is a list of places within the ceremonial county boundaries of Cheshire, in North West England.

A

B

C

D

E

F

G

H

I

K

L

M

N

O

P

R

S

T

U

V

W

See also

 List of Cheshire settlements by population
 List of civil parishes in Cheshire
 Places of interest in Cheshire
 List of places in England 

!
Places
Cheshire